Makaravilakku is an annual festival held on Makara Sankranti in Kerala, India at the shrine of Sabarimala. The festival includes the Thiruvabharanam (sacred ornaments of Lord Ayyappan) procession and a congregation at the hill shrine of Sabarimala. An estimated half a million devotees flow to Sabarimala every year to have a darshan (vision) of this ritual this day.

Legend
Lord Sri Rama and his brother Lakshmana met Sabari, a tribal devotee, at Sabarimala. Sabari offered the Lord fruits after tasting them. But the Lord accepted them gladly and whole-heartedly. The Lord then turned and saw a divine person doing tapas. He asked Sabari who it was. Sabari said it was Sasta. Rama walked towards Sasta and the latter stood up to welcome Rama. The anniversary of this incident is celebrated on Makara Vilakku day.

Agents behind the Makaravilakku 
Makaravilakku is a part of a religious ritual that was practiced since the past by the Malayaraya tribe who are believed to be the descendants of Malayaman Kaari in the forest of Ponnambalamedu (the place where Makaravilakku appears) and then later secretly continued by The Travancore Devaswom Board (TDB). Technically, there is nothing supernatural in the Makaravilakku. It has been practiced for more than hundreds of years by the tribes. Actually, there is a temple in the Ponnambalamedu which is not open to the public and is under the control of Forest department of Kerala. When the Sirius star appears in the sky on Makaram 1st, these tribes too perform their rituals in that temple. Like in the temple of Sabarimala they also perform Arathi encircling the fire around the Idol. It is performed by lighting camphor and ghee in a vessel and is circled around the idol 3 times. This lamp or fire is what we see from the Sabarimala temple and call it Makara Jyothi but the fire in the Ponnambalamedu is the actual Makaravilakku. The holy Light.
"The Jyothi is a star that appears on the skies on the Makarasamkrama day above the Ponnambalamedu towards the eastern direction of Sabarimala. The lamp lighted during the time of Deeparadhana (arati) in the temple is known as Makara Vilakku".

 Makarajyothi: The Sirius Star
 Makaravilakku: The Arathi that performed by The tribes and later continued by The Travancore Devaswom Board (TDB)

The Makaravillakku can be seen from Sannidhanam, Pandithavalam, Pulmedu, Hilltop, Chalakayam, Attathodu, Saramkuthi, Neelimala, Marakootam, Panjipara. 

The name refers to the lighting of a bright "vilakku" (lamp) three times atop Ponnambalamedu the sanctum sanctorum of Sabarimala, which were used to communicated the completion of Deeparadhana in Ponnampalamedu (and compare Makara Jyothi).

References

January events
Hindu festivals in Kerala
Festivals in Pathanamthitta district